The Tolleson Elementary School District is an elementary school district in Tolleson, Arizona, United States. It operates four schools.

Elementary schools
 Arizona Desert
 Desert Oasis
 Porfirio Gonzales
 Sheely Farms

References

External links
 

School districts in Maricopa County, Arizona
School districts in Arizona